Nalbandian (Western Armenian: Նալպանտեան) is an Armenian surname that derives from , which is of Persian origin.

Nalbandian may refer to:

People

Nalbandian
 Abbas Nalbandian (1947 – 1987), Iranian playwright
 Armen Nalbandian (born 1978), American Jazz pianist/composer
 David Nalbandian (born 1982), Argentine tennis player
 Edward Nalbandian (1927 – 2006), Armenian-American businessman, owner of Zachary All Clothing
 John B. Nalbandian (born 1969), Armenian-American/Japanese-American lawyer and judge
 Joseph Nalbandian (1919 – after 1985), Lebanese Armenian football player and manager
 Louise Nalbandian, Armenian-American historian and professor
 Maria Nalbandian (born 1985), Lebanese Armenian singer
 Mikayel Nalbandian (1829 – 1866), Armenian writer, poet, political theorist and activist

Nalbandyan
 Aleksan Nalbandyan (born 1971), Armenian and Russian amateur boxer
 Aram Nalbandyan (1908 – 1987), Soviet physicist
Dmitry Nalbandyan (1906 – 1993), Georgian-Armenian painter
 Eduard Nalbandyan (born 1956), Armenian politician, Minister of Foreign Affairs
 Suren Nalbandyan (born 1956), Soviet wrestler

Places
 Nalbandyan, a town in Armenia

Armenian-language surnames
Persian-language surnames